Nampula is a province of northern Mozambique. Nampula is the capital of the province.

History
Under Portuguese rule this province was named Moçambique but with independence, the name Mozambique was used for the entire country and the province renamed for its capital.
The island, Ilha de Moçambique, was declared a UNESCO World Heritage Site in 1992. Massive refugee movements due to 15 years of civil war have destroyed a unique coexistence of many cultures on this island.

Geography

Nampula Province is located in northeastern Mozambique. It is bordered on the north by Cabo Delgado Province and the Lúrio River, which the Mozambican government has plans to build a 120-megawatt hydroelectric plant on to supply electricity to the province and Cabo Delgado Province. Napula Province borders Niassa Province to the northwest and west, Zambezia Province to the southwest, and the Indian Ocean to the east. The Ligonha River separates it from Zambezia Province; the Makua peoples inhabit the area to the north of the river. From the south, the Malema River flows from the Namuli hills into the Ligonha. The Meluli River flows down through the province in a southeasterly direction, flowing into the Indian Ocean to the south of Angoche Island.

To the west of the city of Nampula, which lies in the heart of the province, are several hilly areas. Mountains in the province include Mount Inago (1804 m), Mount Ribaue, Mount Panda and Mount Nairucu.

Districts

Nampula Province is divided into the 18 districts of:
 Angoche District
 Eráti District
 Lalaua District
 Malema District
 Meconta District
 Mecubúri District
 Memba District
 Mogincual District
 Mogovolas District
 Moma District
 Monapo District
 Mossuril District
 Muecate District
 Murrupula District
 Nacala-a-Velha District
 Nacarôa District
 Nampula District
 Ribáuè District
and the municipalities of:
 Angoche
 Ilha de Moçambique
 Monapo
 Nacala
 Nampula

Economy
The region is a major producer of cotton, and is known as the Cotton Belt of Nampula. Also produced in the province are cashew nuts, tobacco, gems and other minerals. Many of the cotton and tobacco farms in Nampula Province are state-owned.

The Millennium Challenge Corporation (MCC) is involved in a $507 million project with Mozambique
to develop the water delivery system in Nampula Province over five years, to benefit an estimated 1.2 million people.

Demographics
According to the 1997 census, the province had 2,975,747 inhabitants and an area of 78,197 square kilometres, hence resulting in a population density of 38.05 inhabitants per km². Between 1997 and 2007, the population grew by 25.34%. At the time of the 2007 census, a population of 3,985,613 residents was recorded. With an area 79,010 square kilometres, the population density was about 50.44 people per km².

References

External links

  Nampula Province official site

 
Provinces of Mozambique